Tugu may refer to:
 National Monument (Malaysia) or Tugu Negara, a monument in Kuala Lumpur, Malaysia
 Tugu Yogyakarta, a monument in Yogyakarta, Indonesia
 Tugu Muda, a monument in Semarang, Indonesia
 Tugu Keris, a monument in the shape of a kris in Klang, Malaysia
 Heroes Monument or Tugu Pahlawan, a monument in Surabaya, Indonesia
 Mardijker Creole or Papiá Tugu, an extinct Portuguese-based Jakartan creole
 Tugu inscription, a stone inscription of Tarumanagara origins dating to the 5th century

Locations
 Tugu, Ghana, a community in the Tamale Metropolitan District, Northern Region, Ghana
 Tugu Stadium, a stadium used by the Indonesian football club Persitara
 Yogyakarta railway station, a train station in Yogyakarta, Indonesia commonly referred to as Stasiun Tugu
 Kampung Tugu, a subdistrict of Koja, North Jakarta
 Tugu Church, a Protestant church located here

See also